"Doo Doo Doo Doo Doo (Heartbreaker)" is the fourth track on the Rolling Stones' 1973 album Goats Head Soup.

Background
Written by Mick Jagger and Keith Richards, the song's lyrics relate two stories: one is a story of New York City police shooting a boy "right through the heart" because they mistook him for someone else, and the second of a ten-year-old girl who dies in an alley of a drug overdose. Neither of these events are known to be factual.

In April 1973 a ten-year-old boy named Clifford Glover was with his father when plainclothes police stopped them at gunpoint in Queens, in New York City, supposedly having mistaken the two for suspects in an armed robbery (the robbers were described as being about one foot taller than the boy). The boy and his father ran, fearing that they were about to be victims of a robbery. The police chased them and one officer shot the 10-year-old boy in the back, killing him. The bullet entered Glover's lower back and emerged at the top of his chest (i.e., went through his heart). The case resulted in riots and a murder indictment against the officer, who was later acquitted in a jury trial.

After telling the story of the police shooting the wrong person, Jagger sings,

 You heartbreaker, with your .44, I want to tear your world apart.

The .44 magnum cartridge had recently been made famous by the 1971 film Dirty Harry, in which Harry Callahan uses "the most powerful handgun in the world" to cleanse the streets of crime. The lyrics complement the music, which Rolling Stone magazine described as "urban R&B" for its funk influence and prominent clavinet part (played by Billy Preston).

Recording
"Doo Doo Doo Doo Doo (Heartbreaker)" was first recorded in November and December 1972 before being re-recorded early the following summer. Jim Horn arranged the song's horns and played sax together with Bobby Keys, and Chuck Findley played trumpet. Mick Taylor played the lead guitar part (which features a wah-wah pedal and a Leslie speaker), Richards played rhythm guitar and bass; Billy Preston played clavinet (also using a wah-wah during the choruses), and RMI Electra Piano. 

The song appeared on the American version of the compilation album Rewind (1971-1984).

Reception
Released as the second single from Goats Head Soup in the US only (after the  hit "Angie"), the song reached  in the US on the Billboard Hot 100 and has remained a staple on AOR and classic rock radio stations.

Cash Box called it a "powerhouse rocker to once again rocket the Stones to the Top of the Pops" that is "filled with that hard Jagger vocal sensuality and a very tasty bass line."

Charts

References

The Rolling Stones songs
1973 songs
Songs written by Jagger–Richards
Song recordings produced by Jimmy Miller
Music videos directed by Michael Lindsay-Hogg
Songs about New York City
1973 singles